John Francis Whelpton (born 24 March 1950) is an historian and linguist and a specialist in the history of Nepal about which he has written a number of books.

Selected publications
Jang Bahadur in Europe: The First Nepalese Mission to the West. Sahayogi Press, Kathmandu, 1983.
Nepal. Clio Press, Santa Barbara, 1990.
Nepal: Bibliography. 1990. (World bibliographical series)
Kings, Soldiers, and Priests: Nepalese Politics and the Rise of Jang Bahadur Rana, 1830-1857, Manohar Publications, New Delhi, 1991. 
Nationalism and Ethnicity in a Hindu State: The Politics of Culture in Contemporary Nepal. 1996. (Studies in Anthropology and History) (With David N. Gellner)
Nationalism and Ethnicity in a Hindu Kingdom: The Politics of Culture in Contemporary Nepal. Harwood Academic Publishers, Amsterdam, 1997. (Editor)
People, Politics & Ideology: Democracy and Social Change in Nepal. Mandala Book Point, Kathmandu, 1999.
A History of Nepal. University of Cambridge Press, Cambridge, 2005. 
Celebrating 50 Years of VSO in Nepal. 2014. (With Anne Seymour)
The Other Side of the Hill: Learning Cantonese as a Second Language in Hong Kong. 2017.

References

External links
http://www.scmp.com/news/hong-kong/article/1187369/linguist-discovers-new-papal-pickle

Living people
1950 births
People from Nottingham
Alumni of Trinity College, Oxford
Alumni of SOAS University of London
Alumni of the University of Hong Kong
Historians of Asia